Prema Simhasanam is a 1981 Indian Telugu-language action drama film, produced by K. Vidya Sagar under the Tirupathi International banner  and directed by Beeram Mastan Rao. The film stars N. T. Rama Rao, Rati Agnihotri and music is composed by Chakravarthy. The film was a flop at the box office.

Plot
Zamindar Anand Varma  comes across a public auction, where an innocent woman, Rajeswari , is being sold off. Anand marries her to save her from dishonor. His mother Anasuya Devi  opposes this marriage and throws them out after being instigated by her manager Kamaraju . Anand and Rajeswari start living in the village. After a while, Rajeswari becomes pregnant. One day Rajeswari notices a woman trying to commit suicide and learns that she is Anand Varma's maternal uncle's daughter Lakshmi. Lakshmi has been in love with Anand from childhood and has decided to kill herself as he has married Rajeswari. Hearing this, Rajeswari assures Lakshmi that she will fulfill her wish. She forces Anand to marry Lakshmi and dies soon after giving birth to a baby boy. Lakshmi takes care of the baby as her own and consoles a depressed Anand. Eventually, Lakshmi also gives birth to a baby boy. Manager Kamaraju exploits the situation by provoking Anusuya Devi to do away with Rajeswari's son. Kamaraju sends his henchmen to kill the baby. Anand tries to save his son but is killed by the goons. The child is protected by Anand's loyal servant Simhachalam. Simhachalam raises the child. The child, Raja, grows up to be a pop singer and falls in love with a girl Prema. Lakshmi's son Kalyan  is a spoiled-brat, due to the machinations of Kamaraju and his son Ramanandam. Lakshmi tries to reform Kalyan by keeping him away from Kamaraju. So, Kamaraju and Ramanandham plan to kill her. Raja rescues her and she recognizes him as her stepson. Simhachalam tells him the entire story. Now, Raja decides to save his family by destroying their enemies. Raja manages to defeat his enemies, reform his brother Kalyan and marries Prema.

Cast
N. T. Rama Rao as Raja & Anand Varma (dual role)
Rati Agnihotri as Prema
Mohan Babu as Kalyan
Satyanarayana as Ramanadham
Nutan Prasad as Kamaraju
Raavi Kondala Rao as Kesava Varma
P. L. Narayana as Bhairava Murthy
Hema Sundar as Simhachalam
K. R. Vijaya as Lakshmi
Manju Bhargavi as Rajeswari
S. Varalakshmi as Anasuya Devi
Jayamalini as item number
Pushpakumari as Gajjala Kanakaratnam

Soundtrack

Music composed by Chakravarthy. Music released by AVM Audio Company.

References

Indian action drama films
Films scored by K. Chakravarthy
1980s action drama films
1980s Telugu-language films